Korpiklaani is a Finnish folk metal band from Lahti who was formerly known as Shamaani Duo and Shaman.

History

Shamaani Duo
While other folk metal bands began with metal before adding folk music, Korpiklaani started with folk music before turning metal. The roots of Korpiklaani can be traced back to a Sámi folk music group under the name of "Shamaani Duo", an "in house restaurant band" created by Jonne Järvelä in 1993. An album of folk music (Hunka Lunka) was released under this name before Järvelä relocated and "Shamaani Duo" morphed into "Shaman".

Shaman
Shaman was the second incarnation of Korpiklaani, formed in 1997 which is notable for the heavy use of original native Sámic music elements and lyrics in Northern Sámi. The band's music was based on the folk music of Shamaani Duo. The most widely used elements are the shamanic drum, yoik and humppa. Besides yoik, the vocals vary from clean to rather aggressive growling.

The musical style of Shaman is quite distinctive, especially in the slow songs, due to its entrancing atmosphere created by the monophonic, "narrow" synth sound making the deep contrast to the spacious sound of the acoustic guitar, the shamanic drum and yoik singing.

The first recording released under the name of Shaman was the demo single Ođđa máilbmi (New World in Northern Sámi). The video clip shot for the song featured a wolf breaking free from its cage and running into the forest. Besides the single CD the song was included on the band's first full-length album Idja (Night in Northern Sámi, 1999) as well.

The band released another album, Shamániac, in 2002.

Korpiklaani
The band underwent another evolution in 2003, and "Shaman" became "Korpiklaani" (with only Järvelä and drummer Samu Ruotsalainen remaining from the last "Shaman" lineup), with the music style to a more conventional folk metal with folk/thrash vocals instead of yoiking. Shamániac had already featured a strong resemblance to the future Korpiklaani style. In fact, the song, "Vuola lávlla", has the same music as the Korpiklaani song, "Beer Beer".

The change in name was accompanied by a change in the music. The traditional yoik vocals and the use of the Northern Sámi language were dropped while the synthesizer was replaced with real folk instruments. Jonne Järvelä credits his work with Finntroll as the catalyst for the shift in emphasis from folk to metal. Their song lyrics are often related to alcohol and partying. In their first three albums, most of their songs were in English and only a few in Finnish. However, in the following releases this changed, with most of the songs in their latest albums being sung in Finnish.

According to Jonne Järvelä, Korpiklaani's music would be seen as "old people's music with heavy metal guitars" in Finland.

There has been some collaboration between Korpiklaani and Finntroll, as Samu Ruotsalainen of Finntroll provided session drums for their debut album Spirit of the Forest and Järvelä provided the yoiking for the title track of Finntroll's album Jaktens Tid.

Juha Jyrkäs has written some Finnish lyrics to Korpiklaani and from 2011 lyrics are written by poet Tuomas Keskimäki, who writes lyrics in the old Finnish "kalevalametre".

The name Korpiklaani means "Backwoods Clan" in the Finnish language. In spoken language "korpi" means dark old forest. In biology it refers to boreal forest appearing on moist moraine soils, characterized by dense growth of spruce and a deep layer of moss as undergrowth.

In September 2011 Korpiklaani announced that Jaakko "Hittavainen" Lemmetty would be leaving the band due to personal health issues which made the constant touring and recording impossible. First his replacement was violist Teemu Eerola and later, nowadays permanent member, Tuomas Rounakari. In 2013 accordion player Juho Kauppinen left Korpiklaani and the new accordion player is Sami Perttula.

Personnel

Members

Current lineup
 Jonne Järvelä – vocals, guitars (1993–present)
 Kalle "Cane" Savijärvi – guitars (2003–present)
 Jarkko Aaltonen – bass (2005–present)
 Sami Perttula – accordion (2013–present)
 Samuli Mikkonen – drums (2019–present)

Former members

 Maaren Aikio – vocals, percussion (1993–1997)
 Juke Eräkangas – drums, keyboards, backing vocals (1999)
 Ilkka Kilpeläinen – bass, backing vocals (1999)
 Tero Piirainen – guitars, keyboards, backing vocals (1999)
 Samu Ruotsalainen – drums (2002–2003)
 Janne G`thaur – bass (2002)
 Hosse Latvala – drums, percussion (2002)
 Veera Muhli – keyboards (2002)
 Toni Näykki – guitars (2002)
 Henri "Trollhorn" Sorvali – keyboards (2002)
 Matti "Matson" Johansson – drums (2003–2019)
 Jaakko "Hittavainen" Lemmetty – violin, jouhikko, bagpipes, flute (2003–2011)
 Toni "Honka" Honkanen – guitars (2003–2005)
 Ali Määttä – percussion (2003–2005)
 Arto Tissari – bass (2003–2005)
 Juho Kauppinen – accordion (2004–2013)
 Teemu Eerola – violin (2011)
 Tuomas Rounakari – violin (2012–2022)

Timeline

Discography

Studio albums
as Shamaani Duo
Hunka Lunka (1996)

as Shaman
Idja (1999)
Shamániac (2002)

as Korpiklaani

 Spirit of the Forest (2003)
 Voice of Wilderness (2005)
 Tales Along This Road (2006)
 Tervaskanto (2007)
 Korven Kuningas (2008)
 Karkelo (2009)
 Ukon Wacka (2011)
 Manala (2012)
 Noita (2015)
 Kulkija (2018)
 Jylhä (2021)

References

External links

 Official website
 Korpiklaani at Napalm Records

1993 establishments in Finland
Finnish folk metal musical groups
Musical groups established in 1993
Nuclear Blast artists
Sámi musical groups